Elk Prairie may refer to:

Elk Prairie, California, former name of Fruitland, California
Elk Prairie Township, Jefferson County, Illinois
Elk Prairie, Missouri